Sophie de Ronchi (born 24 September 1985 in Marseille, France) is an Olympic and National-Record holding breaststroke and medley swimmer from France. She swam for France at the 2008 Olympics.

At the 2009 French Championships in April, she bettered the French Records in the 50 m and 200 m breaststroke to 30.96 and 2:25.19.

See also
 :fr:Sophie de Ronchi—de Ronchi's entry on French Wikipedia.
 www.deronchi.com—de Rochi's website.

References

1985 births
Living people
French female breaststroke swimmers
French female medley swimmers
Olympic swimmers of France
Swimmers at the 2008 Summer Olympics
Swimmers from Marseille
Mediterranean Games bronze medalists for France
Mediterranean Games medalists in swimming
Swimmers at the 2001 Mediterranean Games